Richard Pérez, widely known as Richie Pérez (1944 – March 27, 2004) was a Hispanic American teacher and activist.

Life
In 1969 Pérez joined the Young Lords, a Puerto Rican rights group which employed radical nonviolent direct action.

From the 1980s until his death, he was director of community development at the Community Service Society, a nonprofit group serving the poor. He campaigned against racially motivated violence and pushed for voter registration.

His papers are held in the Archives of the Puerto Rican Diaspora at Hunter College, CUNY.

Pérez died of cancer on March 27, 2004.

References

External links
 The Richie Pérez Interviews
 Remembering & Thanking Richie Perez 1944-2004

1944 births
2004 deaths
American people of Puerto Rican descent
Activists for Hispanic and Latino American civil rights